Prairie Lake is a town in Barron County in the U.S. state of Wisconsin. The population was 1,532 at the 2010 census. The unincorporated community of Wickware is located partially in the town.

Geography
The town of Prairie Lake is located southeast of the center of Barron County. Its namesake lake runs from northwest to southeast across the northeast corner of the town and extends north into the town of Stanley and southeast into the city of Chetek, where it becomes Lake Chetek.

U.S. Route 53, a four-lane expressway, crosses the town from northwest to southeast on land that is between the lake and the Red Cedar River. There are no exits within the town; the nearest access points are Exit 126 in Chetek and Exit 135 in Cameron.

Demographics
As of the census of 2000, there were 1,369 people, 528 households, and 412 families residing in the town. The population density was 41.3 people per square mile (16.0/km2).  There were 739 housing units at an average density of 22.3 per square mile (8.6/km2). The racial makeup of the town was 99.27% White, 0.22% Native American, 0.15% Asian, 0.07% from other races, and 0.29% from two or more races. Hispanic or Latino of any race were 0.44% of the population.

There were 528 households, out of which 34.1% had children under the age of 18 living with them, 68.8% were married couples living together, 4.5% had a female householder with no husband present, and 21.8% were non-families. 18.4% of all households were made up of individuals, and 7.6% had someone living alone who was 65 years of age or older. The average household size was 2.59 and the average family size was 2.92.

In the town, the population was spread out, with 25.4% under the age of 18, 5.9% from 18 to 24, 27.1% from 25 to 44, 26.6% from 45 to 64, and 15.0% who were 65 years of age or older. The median age was 40 years. For every 100 females, there were 101.0 males. For every 100 females age 18 and over, there were 101.8 males.

The median income for a household in the town was $40,048, and the median income for a family was $43,750. Males had a median income of $31,000 versus $21,164 for females. The per capita income for the town was $17,507. About 7.6% of families and 8.8% of the population were below the poverty line, including 11.4% of those under age 18 and 12.2% of those age 65 or over.

References

External links

Towns in Barron County, Wisconsin
Towns in Wisconsin